The First Battle of Ulrichen in 1211 was a decisive defeat of Bernese troops under Duke Berthold V of Zähringen by the army of the Canton of Valais under the Bishop of Sion Landrich von Mont.  The battle took place near Ulrichen which is now part of Obergoms.  Many details about the battle are uncertain or questioned by historians.

History 
Twenty years before the battle, in 1191, Berchtold V had established the city of Bern to expand his power into the lands of the County of Savoy. By 1211 he had quarreled with Thomas of Savoy and determined to use the new city as a base to expand into the Canton of Valais. Assembling an army of about 13,000 men he marched over the Grimsel pass. As they descended from the pass they burnt Oberwald and Obergesteln villages. The Valaisian army assembled under the command of the Bishop of Sion Landrich von Mont near Ulrichen.

Very little is recorded about the battle, but Berchtold's army suffered heavy casualties and the survivors retreated back over the Grimsel pass. They were closely followed by the victorious Valaisian army. At a small lake in the pass, Berchtold's army paused and attempted to rally the retreating soldiers. However, the Valaiser army fell on the survivors and destroyed most of the remaining soldiers. The lake is now known as Totensee or Lake of the Dead due to the slaughter that happened on the lake shore.

Impact
Berchtold's defeat at Ulrichen ended his expansion into the Canton of Valais.  Over 200 years later, in 1419 during the Raron affair, a Bernese army crossed the Grimsel pass to support the claims of the Counts of Raron.  According to tradition, Thomas [Brantschen] or [Riedie] a resident of Ulrichen, saw the invading army and declared;

He then led 400 to 600 men against a Bernese army and defeated them, though he died in the process.  Whether Thomas actually existed is uncertain since the first records of his attack are from over a century later.  However, the two battles of Ulrichen and Thomas' attack are an important theme in Valaisian literature and folklore.

Today there is a large granite cross on the supposed site of the battle.

See also
 Battles of the Old Swiss Confederacy

References

Ulrichen
History of Bern
Valais
Ulrichen